McCord is a census-designated place (CDP) in Osage County, Oklahoma, United States. The population was 1,440 at the 2010 census, a decrease of 15.8 percent from the figure of 1,711 reported in 2000.

Geography
It is adjacent to the southern boundary of Ponca City.

Demographics

As of the census of 2000, there were 1,711 people, 676 households, and 506 families residing in McCord. The population density was 393.4 people per square mile (151.9/km2). There were 772 housing units at an average density of 177.5/sq mi (68.5/km2). The racial makeup of the CDP was 87.73% White, 0.76% African American, 5.20% Native American, 0.41% Asian, 0.76% from other races, and 5.14% from two or more races. Hispanic or Latino of any race were 2.45% of the population.

There were 676 households, out of which 28.6% had children under the age of 18 living with them, 63.5% were married couples living together, 7.1% had a female householder with no husband present, and 25.1% were non-families. 21.2% of all households were made up of individuals, and 8.4% had someone living alone who was 65 years of age or older. The average household size was 2.53 and the average family size was 2.94.

In the CDP the population was spread out, with 25.0% under the age of 18, 6.7% from 18 to 24, 25.6% from 25 to 44, 28.5% from 45 to 64, and 14.1% who were 65 years of age or older. The median age was 41 years. For every 100 females, there were 107.1 males. For every 100 females age 18 and over, there were 99.8 males.

The median income for a household in the CDP was $39,479, and the median income for a family was $45,446. Males had a median income of $36,429 versus $20,927 for females. The per capita income for the CDP was $17,654. About 7.9% of families and 10.9% of the population were below the poverty line, including 13.8% of those under age 18 and 8.1% of those age 65 or over.

References

Census-designated places in Osage County, Oklahoma
Oklahoma populated places on the Arkansas River